The American Academy of Political and Social Science (AAPSS) was founded in 1889 to promote progress in the social sciences.  Sparked by Professor Edmund J. James and drawing from members of the faculty of the University of Pennsylvania, Swarthmore College, and Bryn Mawr College, the Academy sought to establish communication between scientific thought and practical effort. The goal of its founders was to foster, across disciplines, important questions in the realm of social sciences, and to promote the work of those whose research aimed to address important social problems. Today the AAPSS is headquartered at the Annenberg Public Policy Center at the University of Pennsylvania in Philadelphia and aims to offer interdisciplinary perspectives on important social issues.

Establishment
The primary modes of the Academy's communication were to be the bimonthly journal, The Annals, annual meetings, symposia, and special publications.  Difficult topics were not avoided.  The 1901 annual meeting was on race relations in America, and included a paper by Booker T. Washington. The Academy began as a membership organization. Membership was open and inclusive with an emphasis on educated professionals; even from its establishment, women were permitted to obtain membership. The Academy's members have included not only academicians, but also distinguished public servants such as Herbert Hoover and Frances Perkins. Perhaps for this reason, it is not a member of the American Council of Learned Societies.

In 2000 the Academy began selecting and installing Fellows in recognition of social scientists who have made outstanding contributions to the field. Since 2008 the Academy has presented an annual Daniel Patrick Moynihan Prize to recognize public officials and/or scholars who have used social science and informed judgment to advance the public good. The Academy continues to publish its bimonthly journal, and holds congressional briefings, special conferences, and biannual meetings of its board of directors. The Academy has moved away from the membership model, however.

Presidents of the Academy 

 1889–1895 -  Edmund J. James
 1896–1900 -  Roland P. Falkner (acting in the absence of Edmund J. James)
 1900–1902 -  Samuel McCune Lindsay
 1902–1929 -  Leo S. Rowe
 1930–1952 -  Ernest M. Patterson
 1953–1970 -  James C. Charlesworth
 1970–1972 -  Richard D. Lambert
 1972–1998 -  Marvin E. Wolfgang
 1998–1999 -  Kathleen Hall Jamieson
 1999–2001 -  Jaroslav Pelikan
 2001–2005 -  Lawrence W. Sherman
 2006–2015 -  Douglas S. Massey
 2015–2021 -  Kenneth Prewitt
2021–present Marta Tienda

Publications

The Annals

The Annals of the American Academy of Political and Social Science, a policy and scientific journal in political and social science, began publication in July 1890 and has continued uninterrupted up until the present. The journal began as a quarterly but switched to a bi-monthly schedule effective with volume 2 in the summer of 1891. From 1897 (volume 6), volume numbers began to be changed every three issues, with each single issue after volume 38 constituting its own volume. A number of pamphlet supplements were also issued during the journal's early years.

The Annals recent authors and editors have included Henry Louis Gates Jr., Richard A. Clarke, Joseph S. Nye, Jr., and William Julius Wilson. The Annals has been published by SAGE Publications since 1981. In 2003, it changed from its traditional plain orange cover to a more graphic cover containing photographs.

The Annals has covered topics including "The World's Food" (November, 1917) to "The Motion Picture and its Economic and Social Aspects" (November 1926), "Women in the Modern World" (May, 1929), "America and Japan" (May, 1941), "Urban Renewal Goals and Standards" (March, 1964), and "The Global Refugee Problem" (May, 1982). More recent volumes have focused on such topics as "Confronting the Specter of Nuclear Terrorism"  and "The Moynihan Report Revisited: Lessons and Reflections after Four Decades".

According to the Journal Citation Reports, the journal has a 2017 impact factor of 2.401, ranking it 33rd out of 169 journals in the category "Political Science" and 11th out of 94 journals in the category "Social Sciences, Interdisciplinary".

Editors 

 1890–1895,  Edmund J. James
 1896–1900,  Roland P. Falkner
 Jan. 1901–Mar. 1902,  Henry Rogers Seager
 May 1902–Sept. 1914,  Emory R. Johnson
 Nov. 1914–July 1929,  Clyde L. King
 Sept. 1929–July 1968,  Thorsten Sellin
 Jan. 1969–Nov. 1995  Richard D. Lambert
 Jan. 1996–Nov. 2003  Alan W. Heston
 Jan 2003–May 2006  Robert W. Pearson
 July 2006–Dec. 2010  Phyllis Kaniss
 Dec. 2010-Dec. 2011  Emily Wood
 Dec. 2011–present  Thomas A. Kecskemethy

The Academy Online
In 2006, the Academy created a blog to take advantage of the Internet to provide a forum for ideas and research in the social sciences. Today, the Academy's website is the main source for news of the Academy, recently published Annals volumes, and information about the Fellows and Moynihan Prize.

Moynihan Prize Winners
 2008 - Alice M. Rivlin
 2009 - David T. Ellwood
 2010 - Robert Greenstein
 2011 - Diane Ravitch
 2012 - Paul Volcker
 2013 - William Julius Wilson
 2014 - Joseph Stiglitz
 2015 - Rebecca Blank
 2016 - Isabel Sawhill and Ron Haskins
 2017 - Alan Krueger
 2018 - John Holdren
 2019 - Samantha Power
2020 - William Nordhaus
2022 - Marian Wright Edelman

See also
The American Academy of Political and Social Science is not to be confused with the following entities:
 Academy of Political Science
 American Academy of Arts and Letters
 American Academy of Arts and Sciences
 American Association for the Advancement of Sciences
 American Political Science Association
 American Social Science Association
 United States National Academy of Sciences

Notes

External links

  American Academy of Political and Social Science official website

Sociological organizations
Academic organizations based in the United States
Non-profit organizations based in Pennsylvania
1889 establishments in Pennsylvania
Organizations established in 1889
Political science in the United States